Daniel Ademir Gutiérrez Rojas (born 16 February 2003) is a Chilean footballer who plays as a defender for Colo-Colo.

Club career
At the age of 4, Gutiérrez came to a club officially affiliated with Colo-Colo based in his birthplace, Arica. On 2011, he moved to Santiago to join Colo-Colo Youth Team at the age of 8. He made his debut at professional level in the first matchday of the 2021 Chilean Primera División in a match against Unión La Calera on March 27, becoming the second Arica-born player who has played for Colo-Colo after Claudio Antezana.

International career
He represented Chile U17 at the 2019 South American U-17 Championship – Chile was the runner-up – and at the 2019 FIFA U-17 World Cup. Next, he took part of the Chile U15 squad at the UEFA U-16 Development Tournament in Finland on April 2019.

In December 2021, he represented Chile U20 as the team captain at the friendly tournament Copa Rául Coloma Rivas, playing three matches. In September 2022, he made 3 appearances in the Costa Cálida Supercup. In the 2022 South American Games, he made an appearance.

He represented Chile at under-23 level in a 1–0 win against Peru U23 on 31 August 2022, in the context of preparations for the 2023 Pan American Games.

References

External links

Daniel Gutiérrez at playmakerstats.com (English version of ceroacero.es)

2003 births
People from Arica
Living people
Chilean footballers
Chile youth international footballers
Chile under-20 international footballers
Chilean Primera División players
Colo-Colo footballers
Association football defenders
Competitors at the 2022 South American Games
21st-century Chilean people